Estádio Maria Lamas Farache, usually known as Frasqueirão is a multi-purpose stadium in the Brazilian city of Natal, Rio Grande do Norte. It is currently used mostly for football matches. The stadium has an initial capacity of 18,000 people and will be expanded to 24,000 spectators.

Estádio Frasqueirão is owned by ABC Futebol Clube. The stadium is named after Maria Lamas Farache, who was the wife of ABC's former chairman Vicente Farache.

History
In 2006, the works on Frasqueirão were completed, costing R$ 12 million (R$ 210 thousand were donated by the Rio Grande do Norte State Government to be used to build the football field). The inaugural match was played on January 22 of that year, when ABC and Alecrim drew 1-1. The first goal of the stadium was scored by Alecrim's da Cunha.

References

 ABC FC Official website
 Templos do Futebol
 Governadora visita estádio Frasqueirão no aniversário do ABC - O Mossorense (October 13, 2005) (retrieved on October 14, 2006)
 História do Futebol do Rio Grande do Norte - Futebol Potiguar (retrieved on October 14, 2006)
World Stadiums

Sports venues in Rio Grande do Norte
Multi-purpose stadiums in Brazil
Football venues in Rio Grande do Norte
ABC Futebol Clube